Calgary-McKnight was a provincial electoral district in Alberta, Canada, mandated to return a single member to the Legislative Assembly of Alberta using the first past the post method of voting from 1971 to 1993.

History
The Calgary-McKnight electoral district was created in the 1971 electoral boundary re-distribution from a merger of Calgary-North and Calgary Queens Park. In the 1993 electoral boundary re-distribution, Calgary-McKnight expanded and was renamed to Calgary Nose Creek. Calgary-McKnight was named because McKnight Boulevard the main east west artery in the north at the time, cut through the middle of the riding.

Members of the Legislative Assembly (MLAs)

Legislature results

1971 general election

1975 general election

1979 general election

1982 general election

1986 general election

1989 general election

See also
List of Alberta provincial electoral districts

References

Further reading

External links
Elections Alberta
The Legislative Assembly of Alberta

Former provincial electoral districts of Alberta
Politics of Calgary